The William S. Clark House, in Eureka, Humboldt County, northern California was built in 1888 by master carpenter Fred B. Butterfield.  Its design includes elements of both Eastlake and Queen Anne Styles of Victorian architecture.

It was built for William S. Clark, a businessman, real estated developer, and mayor of Eureka.

It was listed on the National Register of Historic Places in 1988.

The builder, Fred Butterfield, co-built (along with Walter Butterfield) the NRHP-listed Thomas F. Ricks House at 730 H St. in Eureka.

See also
National Register of Historic Places listings in Humboldt County, California

References

External links

Buildings and structures in Eureka, California
Houses in Humboldt County, California
Houses completed in 1888
Houses on the National Register of Historic Places in California
1880s architecture in the United States
Queen Anne architecture in California
Stick-Eastlake architecture in California
Victorian architecture in California
National Register of Historic Places in Humboldt County, California